Wen Xue (born 5 February 1993) is a Chinese footballer of Korean descent who currently plays for China League Two side Yanbian Longding.

Club career
Wen Xue started his professional football career in 2012 when he was promoted to China League One side Yanbian FC's first squad. On 26 June 2012, he made his senior debut in a 2012 Chinese FA Cup match which Yanbian lost to Dalian Shide 8–0. He played 6 league matches in the 2015 season as Yanbian won promotion to the Chinese Super League. On 16 July 2016, Li made his Super League debut in a 3–0 home victory against Jiangsu Suning, coming on as a substitute for Chi Zhongguo in the 86th minute. On 26 February 2019, Yanbian Funde was dissolved due to owing taxes. 

He would go on to join second tier football club Heilongjiang Lava Spring. He would make his debut in a league game on 7 September 2019 against Inner Mongolia Zhongyou F.C. in a 2-0 victory.

Career statistics
Statistics accurate as of match played 31 December 2020.

Honours

Club
Yanbian Changbaishan 
 China League One: 2015

References

External links
 

1993 births
Living people
Chinese footballers
People from Yanbian
Yanbian Funde F.C. players
Heilongjiang Ice City F.C. players
Chinese Super League players
China League One players
Chinese people of Korean descent
Association football midfielders